Elaphe quatuorlineata (common names: four-lined snake, Bulgarian ratsnake) is a member of the family Colubridae. The four-lined snake is a non-venomous species and one of the largest of the European snakes.

Description
The species' common name refers to the markings seen on the body of adult snakes: four dark stripes running along a yellowish brown body. Juveniles, by contrast, have a dorsal series of dark brown blotches with alternating dark brown spots on the sides, all on a pale brown background. A black line runs from the corner of the eye and the belly is cream to white with darker markings.

Distribution
Four-lined snakes are found in Italy, along the whole western coast of the Balkan peninsula, in the western half of Greece and many of the Greek islands, Macedonia (region), the southwestern corner of Bulgaria, coastal Slovenia, coastal Croatia, Bosnia and Herzegovina, Montenegro, North Macedonia and Albania. The number of snakes and the density of the populations are unknown.

Habitat and behavior
The four-lined snake favours areas with a Mediterranean climate and is found in habitats featuring vegetation, stone walls, sparse woodland, forest margins and deserted buildings. In the winter, individuals spend their time in deserted rodent burrows in groups of four to seven. Their behaviour is generally calmer than that of other snakes (seldom hissing or striking) and they are usually active in the morning and late afternoon. Excellent climbers, they can often be found in the tops of trees.

Diet 
A large proportion of the snakes' diet consists of small mammals, such as rabbits, weasels, squirrels, and mice. They also feed on birds, lizards, newly hatched tortoises and eggs. Females of the species have been shown to feed more often upon birds than do males.

Reproduction 
The mating season lasts from April to May. Females have a gestation period that lasts about two months, the eggs being laid in summer. Females typically lay around 6–18 eggs and incubate them for about 40–60 days.

Conservation 
The four-lined snake has been considered endangered in Bulgaria due to poachers and agriculture. It appears on the IUCN Red List of Threatened Species as "Near Threatened" because of probable significant decline in its abundance and widespread habitat loss.

References 

Elaphe
Reptiles of Europe
Reptiles described in 1789